Curtley or Curtly is a male given name and may refer to one of the following:

 Curtly Ambrose, Antiguan cricketer
 Curtly Hampton, Australian rules footballer
 Curtley Louw, South African cricketer
 Curtley Williams, English cricketer

See also

Curley

Masculine given names
English masculine given names